Rockair was a United States sounding rocket designed for launch from an airplane, which was tested 1955.

External links
https://web.archive.org/web/20050212235252/http://astronautix.com/lvs/rockair.htm

Sounding rockets of the United States